The Alhambra–San Gabriel Line was a Pacific Electric interurban line which traveled between Los Angeles and Temple City.

History
The line was built by the Los Angeles & Pasadena Electric Railway starting in October 1901; it was the first standard gauge interurban railway in Southern California. It opened on June 21, 1902 running between Los Angeles General Hospital and the San Gabriel Mission, soon extended to the Masonic Home. The service became a part of the Pacific Electric system by 1911, terminating at the Pacific Electric Building. Tracks were extended to Temple City on July 29, 1924. Cars began bypassing the Mission in 1928.

The last trips occurred on November 30, 1941. After passenger service ended, tracks were retained for freight until removed in 1951.

Route
Between the 6th & Main Terminal and Sierra Vista Junction, the line followed the Northern District main line. At Sierra Vista Junction (where Huntington Drive and Main Street meet near the western border of Alhambra), the line diverged due east along the median of Main Street, continuing down Main through Alhambra (with a freight spur running south on Palm Avenue to the Southern Pacific's Alhambra depot on Mission Road), into San Gabriel (where Main Street becomes Las Tunas Drive) and finally into Temple City, where the line had an off-street terminal at the northeast corner of Las Tunas Drive and Kauffman Avenue. Additionally, there was a branch that turned south on Mission Drive in San Gabriel, passed along the southern edge of Mission San Gabriel Arcángel, then turned north on Junipero Serra Drive before rejoining the main line at Junipero Serra and Las Tunas drives.

List of major stations

References 

Pacific Electric routes
Alhambra, California
San Gabriel, California
Railway services introduced in 1902
1902 establishments in California
Railway services discontinued in 1941
Railway lines closed in 1951
1951 disestablishments in California
Closed railway lines in the United States